Fernand Legrand (born 1898, date of death unknown) was a French bobsledder. He competed in the four-man event at the 1924 Winter Olympics.

References

1898 births
Year of death missing
French male bobsledders
Olympic bobsledders of France
Bobsledders at the 1924 Winter Olympics
Place of birth missing